Ishq Ki Inteha is a TV serial directed by Kamran Qureshi & Iram Qureshi written by Zafar Mairaj and produced by Raheel Rao & Kamran Qureshi.

This serial is about the trapping of women by mafia working in jails and saloons for prostitution & illegal works. Also, the gang activities utilising young boys being forcibly employed, encouraging habitual drunkards for gambling by providing debts and later blackmailing.

Plot
Bakhtawar (Sarwat Gilani), an educated girl from a lower-class family, loves Farhad (Humayun Saeed), son of a millionaire Malik Jalal (Usmaan Peerzada). Farhad is abroad for higher studies and they have another fellow university mate, Rashid (Kashif Mehmood), a junior lawyer, who is sacrificing his love for Bakhtawar knowing her bend and helps her as much as he can.

After Bakhtawar's father died, her mother (Rubina Ashraf) married to Qayyum (Mehmood Aslam), a gambler and drunkard, who now has a debt of ten hundred thousand from Sheru (Saud), the incharge of gambling place. Sheru threatens him to return his debt within a month or he will make his son Shehzad (Hassan Niazi) a hostage.

Farhad takes Bakhtawar to his home but his father disapproves and insults her. Bakhtawar, mentally stressed, arrives home and finds Qayyum beating Sajida.  She hits Qayyum on head which causes his death.
 
Bakhtawar is arrested.  In jail, she meets a woman Shehnaz (Samina Peerzada), who gives her address for job.  Rashid fights for Bakhtawar and she is released.  Shehnaz works for Malik Jalal, who is underworld Don. They run illegal businesses and present beautiful girls to bureaucrats for getting their files signed. Bakhtawar joins Shehnaz for work, who sends her to a client's home, where she is planned raped.
 
After this shock, Bakhtawar marries Rashid, but gets divorced when they run into the same rapist in a restaurant. Bakhtawar's mother dies after this news.  She again joins Shehnaz, managing her salon to afford Shehzad's studies. 
 
Bakhtawar discovers her pregnancy and later has a baby girl. Shehzad completes studies, gets a good job and likes Farhad's sister Romana (Madiha Iftikhar), but doesn't know until he shows her picture to Bakhtawar.
 
Farhad meets Bakhtawar in a party and again tries to get attention from her.  He gives special attention to her daughter, Minhal (Hareem Qureshi).  Shehnaz forces Bakhtawar to marry Farhad, which she refuses but later agrees due to her daughter.  Bakhtawar doesn't keep any physical relations with him. The day when Bakhtawar realizes his true love, Farhad is murdered by Sheru who turns against his boss Malik Jalal to become a don.
 
Bakhtawar thinks that Malik Jalal had murdered him due to their marriage.  She goes to kill him, he denies Farhad's murder, she pulls gun on him but Sheru kills him before her, she then kills Sheru.
 
Farhad's mother (Saira Wasti) loses her senses after son and husband's murder. She moves to her old home alone.   Bakhtawar is arrested and jailed.  Rashid comes back and fights her case in court.  Baby Minhal remains with Shehnaz. Rashid wins the case and Bakhtawar is released. Bakhtawar tells Rashid that Minhal is his daughter.

Cast

Main cast 
 Humayun Saeed as Malik Farhad
 Sarwat Gilani as Bakhtawar
 Samina Peerzada as Madam Shehnaz
 Usmaan Peerzada as Malik Jalal
 Rubina Ashraf as Bakhtawar's Mother
 Saud as Sharru
 Kashif Mehmood as Rashid
 Madiha Iftikhar as Romana
 Shakeel as Rauf
 Mehmood Aslam as Qayyum 
 Saira Wasti as Rabia
Hassan Niazi as Shehzad

Supporting cast 
 Saleem Miraj as Sheru's Man
 Adil Wadia as Farooqi Sahab
 Tasneem Ansari as Rauf's Wife
 Hareem Qureshi as Minhal
 Hassan Shaheed Mirza

Soundtrack

The theme song was sung by Naeem Abbas Rufi composed by Usman Kunji and lyricists was Shariq Naqvi.

Awards and nominations 
9th Lux Style Awards
 Nominated - Best TV Serial (2010) produced by Raheel Rao & Kamran Qureshi.

See also
 Makan
 Moorat
 Riyasat
 Sarkar Sahab

References

External links
 
 Director's Website
 Facebook Page

Geo TV original programming
Urdu-language television shows
Television shows set in Karachi